John S. Wilson may refer to:

John Wilson (1920s pitcher) (1903–1980), John Samuel Wilson, Major League Baseball pitcher
John S. Wilson (music critic) (1913–2002), American music critic and jazz radio host
John Stuart Wilson (born 1944), mathematician
John S. Wilson (economist) (born 1956), at the World Bank
J. S. Wilson (1888–1969), John Skinner Wilson, pioneer of Scouting
John Silvanus Wilson, Jr. Morehouse College president

See also
John Wilson (disambiguation)